There have been three baronetcies created for persons with the surname Younger, all in the Baronetage of the United Kingdom.

The Younger Baronetcy, of Auchen Castle, was created in 1911 for William Younger, MP for Stamford from 1895 to 1906 and briefly for Peebles and Selkirkshire.

The Younger Baronetcy, of Leckie, was created in 1911 for George Younger, MP and member of the brewing family, later to become Viscount Younger of Leckie

The Younger Baronetcy, of Fountainbridge, Edinburgh, was one of the last baronetcies created in the Baronetage of the United Kingdom, established in 1964. It was created for William Younger, son of a brother of the 1st Viscount Younger of Leckie.

Younger baronets, of Auchen Castle (1911)

Sir William Younger, 1st Baronet (1862–1937)
Sir William Robert Younger, 2nd Baronet (1888–1973)
Sir John William Younger, 3rd Baronet (1920–2002)
Sir Julian William Richard Younger, 4th Baronet (1950–2019)
Sir Andrew William Younger Thieriot, 5th Baronet (born 1986)

There is no heir.

Younger baronets, of Leckie (1911)
see Viscount Younger of Leckie

Younger baronets, of Fountainbridge (1964)
Sir William McEwan Younger, 1st Baronet (1905–1992)

References

Baronetcies in the Baronetage of the United Kingdom
Extinct baronetcies in the Baronetage of the United Kingdom